The steam locomotives of Bavarian Class LE were narrow gauge engines with the Royal Bavarian State Railways (Königlich Bayerische Staats-Eisenbahnen).

History 
The engines were manufactured for the metre gauge route between Eichstätt-Stadt and Eichstätt-Bahnhof. In 1885 the railway procured two units and, in 1892, a third. After the 5.2 kilometre long line was extended from Eichstätt by 30 kilometres, two more engines were added in 1898 and 1900. The machines carried railway numbers I - V. 

The Deutsche Reichsbahn took over all five engines in 1925 as Class 99.07 with numbers 99 071–99 075. The first two locomotives were retired by 1932, the remaining three in 1935, after the whole route was converted to standard gauge.

Technical Features 

The engines were of a design by Krauss that, in similar dimensions, was used for other classes, include some for the Felda Railway, later the Prussian T 31, and designated by the factory as XXXV. 

The locomotives had a box frame with a water tank. The short boiler barrel comprised two boiler rings. On top of the boiler were the steam dome, two spring-balance, safety valves and a sand dome. The flat valves were operated by an Allan valve gear, the connecting rod worked the third axle. On the first locomotives the driving gear was also covered, but these were removed around 1908. The coal bunkers were located in front of the driver's cab. The engines carried up to 1.77 m3 of water and 0.65 tonnes of coal.

The air pump for the compressed-air brake was positioned at the front right, next to the smokebox, the air reservoirs were on the right and left of the boiler and the silencer was fixed to the chimney.

See also 
 Royal Bavarian State Railways
 List of Bavarian locomotives and railbuses

References 

 
 

0-6-0T locomotives
LE
Metre gauge steam locomotives
Railway locomotives introduced in 1885
Krauss locomotives
C n2t locomotives